Hearthside is a historic house in Lincoln, Rhode Island at 677 Great Road (Rt. 123), at the intersection of Breakneck Hill Road.

Stephen Hopkins Smith built this Federal style house in 1810 of fieldstone and it contains 10 fireplaces or hearths. Smith allegedly built the house with winnings from the Louisiana state lottery to unsuccessfully woo a woman from Providence. Frederick C. Sayles bought the property in 1901.
Hearthside served as a private residence until 1996 until the town of Lincoln purchased the property and the "Friends of Hearthside", a nonprofit organization, became overseers of the property.

The house was listed on the National Register of Historic Places in 1973.

See also
National Register of Historic Places listings in Providence County, Rhode Island

References

External links

 Hearthside Website
 Woonsocket site info
 Stephen Smith info
 

Houses on the National Register of Historic Places in Rhode Island
Historic house museums in Rhode Island
Houses completed in 1810
Museums in Providence County, Rhode Island
Houses in Lincoln, Rhode Island
National Register of Historic Places in Providence County, Rhode Island
Historic district contributing properties in Rhode Island